Dannavan Morrison (born 12 June 1960) is a former Bahamian cricketer. Morrison is a right-handed batsman who represented the Bahamas national cricket team.

Morrison made his debut for the Bahamas in the 2006 ICC Americas Championship Division 2 against PanamaBelize.

Morrison made his only Twenty20 appearance for the Bahamas against the Cayman Islands in the 1st round of the 2006 Stanford 20/20.

Morrison represented the Bahamas in the 2010 ICC World Cricket League Division Five and the 2010 ICC Americas Championship Division 2.  Morrison's final match for the Bahamas came against Vanuatu.

References

External links
Dannavan Morrison at Cricinfo
Dannavan Morrison at CricketArchive

1960 births
Living people
Bahamian cricketers